James Lochhead Logan (12 September 1884 – 1968) was a Scottish footballer who played as a half back or left back.

Career
Logan is perhaps best remembered for his spells in English and Scottish League football with Aston Villa (seven seasons) and Rangers (five seasons), winning the national league title with both clubs and making over 100 appearances for each.

He represented the Scottish League XI once in 1913, and won one unofficial wartime appearance  for Scotland in 1916.

Personal life
Logan was born in Barrhead, Renfrewshire, in 1884 and died in Johnstone in 1968 at the age of 84.

He had two brothers who were also noted footballers: elder sibling Alec, a forward was a teammate of James at Aston Villa between 1907 and 1909 and also played for the Scottish League XI before being killed in the First World War; younger sibling Tommy, a defender, played in national cup finals with Falkirk in Scotland and Chelsea in England and received one full cap for Scotland.

Career statistics

Honours 
Aston Villa
 Football League First Division: 1909–10

Rangers
Scottish League Division One: 1912–13
Glasgow Cup: 1912, 1913

Notes

References

Scottish footballers
Queen's Park F.C. players
Aston Villa F.C. players
Rangers F.C. players
People from Barrhead
English Football League players
Scottish Football League players
Scottish Football League representative players
Scotland wartime international footballers
Association football wing halves
Association football fullbacks
1968 deaths
Date of death missing
1884 births
Partick Thistle F.C. players
St Mirren F.C. players
Arthurlie F.C. players
Sportspeople from East Renfrewshire